A Population of One is a Canadian television film, directed by Robert Sherrin and broadcast by CBC Television in 1980. Based on the novel by Constance Beresford-Howe, the film stars Dixie Seatle as Willy Doyle, a young woman who gets her first job as a professor of 19th-century English literature at a university, where she finds herself romantically attracted to her colleague John Trueman (R. H. Thomson).

The cast also includes Tony Van Bridge as Archie Clark, the head of the English faculty; Kate Lynch as Marg, a faculty colleague; Jonathan Welsh as Marg's boyfriend Harry, an activist who is lobbying to get Archie deposed as department head in favour of a younger professor with more modern teaching methods; and Nicholas Campbell as Mike, a student with his own interest in Willy.

The teleplay was written by Anna Sandor.

Awards and nominations

References

External links

1980 films
1980 television films
CBC Television original films
English-language Canadian films
Films based on Canadian novels
Canadian drama television films
1980s Canadian films